Dame Elizabeth Harriet Fradd, DBE, FRCN, is a British nursing administrator. Between 1973–1983, she held a variety of registered nurse, midwife and health visitor posts, while training as a children’s nurse who also managed children's units in Nottingham and worked as a nursing officer at the Department of Health.

In 1994 she gained an MSc in Health Care Policy and Organisation from the University of Nottingham. A year later she became the Director of Nursing and Education at the NHS Executive West Midlands Regional Office. Four years later she was appointed as the Assistant Chief Nursing Officer (Nursing Practice) for the Department of Health.

At national level, she was Assistant Chief Nurse in the Department of Health, a post she moved to after having been the Director of Nursing and Education in the West Midlands Regional Office. She chaired the Joint British Advisory Committee for Children's Nursing for over ten years. She chaired the Children's Nursing Committee for the English National Board and was Vice Chair of the RCN Children’s Nurse Managers Forum.

She served at the Commission for Health Improvement as Director of Nursing and Lead Director for the Inspection and Review Programme. She holds many honorary academic positions which include a Visiting Professor of Nursing at the University of Central England, Birmingham. Her career has also taken an international direction, including an invitation to advise Aboriginal health workers in the Australian outback. She has also acted in an advisory capacity to China, the United States, Canada and Australia. 

Since April 2004 she has been working as an independent adviser on health services and continues to take an interest in children’s health as a Trustee for Contact a Family and the Rainbows Children’s Hospice in Loughborough, and as an adviser to Action for Sick Children.

Awards
She has received honorary doctorates from the University of Central England, University of Wolverhampton and University of Nottingham, where she has a special professorship.  She was made a Fellow of the Royal College of Nursing in 2004.

Honours
Fradd was appointed Dame Commander of the Order of the British Empire (DBE) in the 2009 New Year Honours.

She was picked High Sheriff of Nottinghamshire for the year 2020–21.

External links
Profile at RCN website

References

Year of birth missing (living people)
Living people
English nurses
Academics of Birmingham City University
Dames Commander of the Order of the British Empire
Fellows of the Royal College of Nursing
High Sheriffs of Nottinghamshire
Alumni of the University of Nottingham
British nurses